Gonzales' Tamales is a 1957 Warner Bros. Looney Tunes animated film directed by Friz Freleng. The short was released on November 30, 1957, and stars Speedy Gonzales and Sylvester.

Plot
The majority of the male mice in a Mexican village lament the fact that Speedy Gonzales has been getting in between them and the "pretty girls." One of the mice suggests that they get the "gringo pussycat" Sylvester to chase Speedy out of town. The mice forge a note from Speedy, stating that he will pull Sylvester's tail out by the roots, which Speedy happily does when confronted by the cat. In trying to get Speedy, Sylvester first uses a shotgun and then a hand grenade (as Speedy sings La Cucaracha in Spanish, complete with the lyric about the cockroach not having any marijuana to smoke), with the usual disastrous results. Speedy, however, falls for the cat's final attempt: A wind-up female mouse doll. With Sylvester hot on his feet, Speedy grabs the wind-up toy and takes refuge in a box of red hot peppers—forcing the hungry pussycat to eat them one by one in order to find the resourceful rodent. In between each ingestion of pepper, Sylvester runs to a nearby water cooler for relief. On his last trip to the cooler, he fails to notice that Speedy has substituted the water for tabasco sauce—which sends the cat 500 miles (805 km) high into the horizon.

References

External links
 

1957 films
1957 short films
1957 comedy films
1957 animated films
1950s English-language films
1950s Warner Bros. animated short films
American slapstick comedy films
Surreal comedy films
Looney Tunes shorts
Speedy Gonzales films
Sylvester the Cat films
Films set in Mexico
Short films directed by Friz Freleng
Films scored by Carl Stalling
Films scored by Milt Franklyn
Warner Bros. Cartoons animated short films
Films produced by Edward Selzer